Romi Kessler (born 20 February 1963) is a Swiss gymnast. She competed in six events at the 1984 Summer Olympics.

References

1963 births
Living people
Swiss female artistic gymnasts
Olympic gymnasts of Switzerland
Gymnasts at the 1984 Summer Olympics
Place of birth missing (living people)